Marcus Becker (born 11 September 1981 in Merseburg) is a German slalom canoeist who competed at the international level from 1996 to 2011. He won a silver medal in the C2 event at the 2004 Summer Olympics in Athens.

Becker won six medals at the ICF Canoe Slalom World Championships with a gold (C2: 2003), four silvers (C2: 2006, C2 team: 2003, 2006, 2009), and a bronze (C2: 2005). He also won a gold and two silvers in the C2 team event at the European Championships.

His partner in the C2 boat throughout his career was Stefan Henze.

World Cup individual podiums

1 World Championship counting for World Cup points

References

12 September 2009 final results for the men's C2 team slalom event for the 2009 ICF Canoe Slalom World Championships. - accessed 12 September 2009.
DatabaseOlympics.com profile

1981 births
Living people
People from Merseburg
People from Bezirk Halle
German male canoeists
Sportspeople from Saxony-Anhalt
Olympic canoeists of Germany
Canoeists at the 2004 Summer Olympics
Olympic silver medalists for Germany
Olympic medalists in canoeing
Medalists at the 2004 Summer Olympics
Medalists at the ICF Canoe Slalom World Championships